Douglas Armstrong may refer to:

 Douglas Armstrong (politician), city councillor on the Auckland City Council, New Zealand for the Citizens & Ratepayers ticket
 Douglas B. Armstrong (1888–1969), British philatelist
 Douglas Armstrong (gymnast) (born 1996), Canadian trampolinist

See also
 Doug Armstrong (disambiguation)